The canton of Ouistreham is an administrative division of the Calvados department, northwestern France. Its borders were modified at the French canton reorganisation which came into effect in March 2015. Its seat is in Ouistreham.

Composition

It consists of the following communes:

Bénouville
Biéville-Beuville
Blainville-sur-Orne
Cambes-en-Plaine
Colleville-Montgomery
Hermanville-sur-Mer
Lion-sur-Mer
Mathieu
Ouistreham
Périers-sur-le-Dan
Saint-Aubin-d'Arquenay

Councillors

Pictures of the canton

References

Cantons of Calvados (department)